Chenarestan (also Romanized as Chenārestān) is a village in Holayjan Rural District, in the Central District of Izeh County, Khuzestan Province, Iran. At the 2006 census, its population was 655, in 122 families.

References 

Populated places in Izeh County